Ipidia is a genus of beetles belonging to the family Nitidulidae.

The species of this genus are found in Europe and Japan.

Species:
 Ipidia binotata Reitter, 1875
 Ipidia chujoi Hisamatsu, 1982

References

Nitidulidae